The 2009 Heluva Good! Sour Cream Dips at the Glen was a NASCAR Sprint Cup Series event held on August 10, 2009, at Watkins Glen International.

The race was rained out on the original scheduled day of August 9. The race was won by points leader Tony Stewart, his third win of the year. Stewart scored his fifth win at Watkins Glen. With that win, he passed Jeff Gordon as the all time NASCAR winner at the Glen. As of 2019, that record still stands. Also with his win in that race, Tony Stewart would score his seventh career road course win, breaking him out a four-way tie for second in all time road course wins with Bobby Allison, Rusty Wallace, and Ricky Rudd. Stewart would win an additional road course race at Sonoma in 2016, the year he retired. As of 2019, Tony Stewart is currently in second place with eight road course wins, as Jeff Gordon currently holds the all-time record with nine wins.

During the race, a hard crash involving Sam Hornish Jr., Jeff Gordon, and Jeff Burton, left the drivers shaken but alright. Kasey Kahne got loose under Hornish and Hornish slid hard into the tire barrier. Then Hornish spun back onto the track and Gordon had no way to avoid him and they made hard contact sending Gordon head on into the Armco barrier and Hornish into Jeff Burton, which nearly sent Hornish on his side.

In the late stages of the race, fuel mileage was an issue but no one had any problems. Stewart held off a strong Marcos Ambrose for the win. Drivers from five different countries were in the race including the United States of America, Australia, Colombia, Italy and Canada. An incredible crowd of 85,000 live spectators were enthralled by this 146-minute racing event where the average green flag run was almost 13 laps long. Owing to the high number of accidents and resulting amount of debris, more than 14% of the event was raced under a caution flag.

Top ten finishers

Timeline
Section reference:
 Start of race: Kurt Busch had the pole position as the green flag was waved
 Lap 20: Marcos Ambrose took over the lead from Kurt Busch
 Lap 28: Kurt Busch took over the lead from Marcos Ambrose
 Lap 29: Marcos Ambrose took over the lead from Kurt Busch
 Lap 30: Jimmie Johnson took over the lead from Marcos Ambrose
 Lap 34: Kyle Busch took over the lead from Jimmie Johnson
 Lap 46: Tony Stewart took over the lead from Kyle Busch
 Lap 56: Kurt Busch took over the lead from Tony Stewart
 Lap 59: David Stremme took over the lead from Kurt Busch
 Lap 60: Scott Speed took over the lead from David Stremme
 Lap 64: Kyle Busch took over the lead from Scott Speed
 Lap 67: Tony Stewart took over the lead from Kyle Busch
 Finish: Tony Stewart was officially declared the winner of the event

Standings after the race

References

Heluva Good! Sour Cream Dips at The Glen
Heluva Good! Sour Cream Dips at The Glen
NASCAR races at Watkins Glen International
August 2009 sports events in the United States